The Montenegrin Navy (Montenegrin: Mornarica Vojske Crne Gore) is the naval branch of the military of Montenegro.

The Montenegrin Navy was established in 2006 following the secession of Montenegro from the State Union of Serbia and Montenegro. Nearly all of the navy's equipment was inherited from the armed forces of the State Union—as Montenegro contained the entire coastline of the former union, it retained practically the entire naval force.

Units & structure
  Navy (Montenegrin: Mornarica)
 Naval Surface Forces (Montenegrin: Površinske pomorske snage)
  Patrol Boat 33 (Montenegrin: Patrolni Brod 33)
  Patrol Boat 34 (Montenegrin: Patrolni Brod 34)
  Rescue Detachment (Montenegrin: Odred za spašavanje)
 Observation Forces (Montenegrin: Snage za osmatranje)
  Coastal Surveillance Detachment (Montenegrin: Odred za nadzor mora)
 Special Forces (Montenegrin: Specijalne snage)
  Marine Detachment (Montenegrin: Pomorski odred)
  Training ship Jadran (Montenegrin: Školski Brod "Jadran")
  Serving Platoon (Montenegrin: Vod za opsluživanje'')

Purpose
Deterring the armed threat to Montenegro:
Preparations for the defense (training, exercising and maintaining a high level of combat readiness).
Defence Cooperation
Defense of the territorial waters:
Protection of the sovereignty of the waters and air space above it.
Defending against unconventional threats against the armed forces.
Support to allied forces that are engaged in the defense of Montenegro.

Bases

 Bar Naval base, (Bar)
 Pero Ćetković base, (Bar)
 Pristan base, (Herceg Novi)

Vessels

Ranks

Commissioned officer ranks
The rank insignia of commissioned officers.

Other ranks
The rank insignia of non-commissioned officers and enlisted personnel.

References

External links

 
Military of Montenegro
Montenegro
Military units and formations established in 2006